Thurl Arthur Ravenscroft (February 6, 1914May 22, 2005) was an American actor and bass singer. He was known as one of the booming voices behind Kellogg's Frosted Flakes animated spokesman Tony the Tiger for more than five decades. He was also the uncredited vocalist for the song "You're a Mean One, Mr. Grinch" from the classic Christmas television special, Dr. Seuss' How the Grinch Stole Christmas!

Ravenscroft did voice-over work and singing for Disney in various films and Disneyland attractions (which were later featured at Walt Disney World), the best known including The Haunted Mansion, Country Bear Jamboree, Mark Twain Riverboat, Pirates of the Caribbean, Disneyland Railroad, and Walt Disney's Enchanted Tiki Room.

His voice acting career began in 1939 and lasted until his death in 2005 at age 91.

Early life and career
Ravenscroft left his native Norfolk, Nebraska, in 1933 for California, where he studied at Otis Art Institute. He achieved early success as part of a singing group called The Mellomen. The Mellomen can be heard on many popular recordings of the Big Band Era, including backup for Bing Crosby, Frankie Laine, Spike Jones, Jo Stafford, and Rosemary Clooney.  Their earliest contribution to a Disney film was for Pinocchio (1940), to which they contributed the song "Honest John". This was deleted from the film, but can still be heard in the supplements on the 2009 DVD. Ravenscroft also voiced Monstro the Whale in Pinocchio. The Mellomen contributed to other Disney films, such as Alice in Wonderland and Lady and the Tramp. The group appeared on camera in a few episodes of the Disney anthology television series; in one instance recording a canine chorus for Lady and the Tramp and in another as a barbershop quartet that reminds Walt Disney of the name of the young newspaper reporter Gallegher.

Ravenscroft is also heard with the quartet on some of the Merrie Melodies and Looney Tunes with Mel Blanc at Warner Bros. as well as on radio "driving Jack Benny crazy" on The Jack Benny Program as part of The Sportsmen Quartet.

During World War II, Ravenscroft served as a civilian navigator contracted to the U.S. Air Transport Command, spending five years flying courier missions across the north and south Atlantic. Among the notables carried on board his flights were Winston Churchill and Bob Hope. As he told an interviewer: "I flew Winston Churchill to a conference in Algiers and flew Bob Hope to the troops a couple of times. So it was fun."

Ravenscroft sang bass on Rosemary Clooney's "This Ole House", which went to No. 1 in both the United States and Britain in 1954, as well as Stuart Hamblen's original version of that same song. He sang on the soundtrack for Ken Clark as "Stewpot" in South Pacific, one of the top-selling albums of the 1950s. He also backed The DeCastro Sisters on their 1955 top 20 hit, "Boom Boom Boomerang." Singing with the Johnny Mann Singers, his distinctive bass can also be heard as part of the chorus on 28 of their albums that were released during the 1960s and 1970s. He was also the bass singer on Bobby Vee's 1960 Liberty hit record "Devil or Angel". Andy Williams' recording of "The 12 Days of Christmas" features him as well. In the 1980s and 1990s, Ravenscroft was narrator for the annual Pageant of the Masters art show at the Laguna Beach, California, Festival of the Arts.

He sang the opening songs for the two Disney serials used on The Mickey Mouse Club, Boys of the Western Sea and The Hardy Boys: Mystery of the Applegate Treasure.

He sang the "Twitterpatter Song" and "Thumper's Song" on the Disneyland record Peter Cottontail and other Funny Bunnies.

On the Disneyland record All About Dragons, he both provided the narration and sang the songs "The Reluctant Dragon" and "The Loch Ness Monster".

His voice was heard during the Pirates of the Caribbean ride as well as The Haunted Mansion at Disneyland as Uncle Theodore, the lead vocalist of the singing busts in the cemetery near the end of the ride. He also played the Narrator in The Story and Song From the Haunted Mansion. Ravenscroft is also heard in the Enchanted Tiki Room as the voice of Fritz the Animatronics parrot, as well as the tree-like Tangaroa tiki god in the pre-show outside the attraction. He was also the voice of the Disneyland Railroad in the 1990s. Further roles include that of The First Mate on The Mark Twain Riverboat and of the American bison head named Buff at The Country Bear Jamboree.

Later career
One of Ravenscroft's best-known uncredited works is as the vocalist for the song "You're a Mean One, Mr. Grinch."  His name was accidentally omitted from the credits, leading many to believe that the cartoon's narrator, Boris Karloff, sang the song, while others cited Tennessee Ernie Ford as the song's signature voice. The song, now credited to Ravenscroft, peaked on the U.S. Billboard Hot 100 chart at number 32 for the week ending January 2, 2021. Thanks to You're a Mean One, Mr. Grinch, Thurl Ravenscroft has officially hit the Top 40 as a solo artist.

Ravenscroft also sang "No Dogs Allowed" in the Peanuts animated motion picture Snoopy, Come Home and I Was a Teenaged Brain Surgeon for Spike Jones.

For more than 50 years, he was the uncredited voice of Tony the Tiger for Kellogg's Frosted Flakes.  His booming bass gave the cereal's tiger mascot a voice with the catchphrase "They're g-r-r-r-eat!!!!".

Various record companies, such as Abbott, Coral, Brunswick, and "X" (a division of RCA) also released singles by Ravenscroft, often in duets with little-known female vocalists, in an attempt to turn the bass-voiced veteran into a pop singer. These efforts were commercially unsuccessful, if often quite interesting. He was also teamed up with the Andrews Sisters (on the Dot Records album The Andrews Sisters Present) on the cover of Johnny Cymbal's "Mr. Bass Man". The Mellomen released some doo-wop records under the name Big John & the Buzzards, a name apparently given to them by the rock-and-roll-hating Mitch Miller.

A devoted Christian, he appeared on many religious television shows such as The Hour of Power.  In 1970, he recorded an album called Great Hymns in Story and Song, which featured him singing 10 hymns, each prefaced with the stories of how each hymn came to be, with the background vocals and instrumentals arranged and conducted by Ralph Carmichael.

He said his lifelong dream was to record the entire Bible on tape, but James Earl Jones "beat him out". On an episode of the TV variety series Donny & Marie featuring guest stars from the first Star Wars movie, Ravenscroft provided the voice for Darth Vader, voiced in the movie by Jones.

Later life and death
Ravenscroft married June Seamans in 1946 and they had two children. June died in 1999 from unknown causes. Ravenscroft semi-retired and did not work at any other studio, but continued to voice Tony the Tiger through 2004 (with limo transportation provided by Kellogg's) and was also interviewed that year by the Disney "Extinct Attractions Club" website. He died in his home on May 22, 2005, from prostate cancer, and was buried at the Memorial Gardens at the Crystal Cathedral in Garden Grove, California.

In the June 6, 2005, issue of the advertising industry journal Advertising Age, Kellogg's ran an advertisement commemorating Ravenscroft, the headline reading: "Behind every great character is an even greater man." After his death, Lee Marshall replaced him as the voice of Tony the Tiger in the Kellogg's commercials, but some commercials still recycle clips of Ravenscroft.

Filmography

Commercials

Partial solo discography

Mad, Baby, Mad – 1955 (Fabor)
I Ain't Afraid – 1956 (Bally)
You Wanna Talk About Texas – 1956
Wing Ding Ding – 1956
Big Paul Bunyan – 1962 (Globe)
Gold Dubloons and Pieces of Eight – 1962 (The Hardy Boys: Mystery of the Applegate Treasure)
The Headless Horseman – 1965 (Disney)
Great Hymns In Story And Song – 1970 (Light)
Nathaniel the Grublet (In Direwood) – 1979 (Birdwing)
Psalms and Selahs – 2002

References

External links

 All Things Thurl (an authorized fan site, to which Ravenscroft contributed; includes discography)
 
 
 
 THURL'S GRRRRRRR-EAT! A Conversation With Thurl Ravenscroft
 All About Dragons - Part 1 (the first side of the LP)
 All About Dragons - Part 2 (the second side of the LP)

1914 births
2005 deaths
20th-century American male actors
20th-century American singers
20th-century American male singers
American basses
American male voice actors
American performers of Christian music
Audiobook narrators
Deaths from cancer in California
Deaths from prostate cancer
Disney people
Kellogg's people
Male actors from Nebraska
People from Norfolk, Nebraska
Singers from Nebraska
United States Army Air Forces officers
United States Army Air Forces personnel of World War II